Theodoxus anatolicus is a species of a freshwater snail with an operculum, an aquatic gastropod mollusk in the family Neritidae, the nerites.

Distribution
This species occurs in:
 Turkey
 Cyprus

References

 Eichhorst T.E. (2016). Neritidae of the world. Volume 2. Harxheim: Conchbooks. Pp. 696-1366.

External links
 Mousson, A. (1874). Coquilles terrestres et fluviatiles recueillies par M. le Dr Alex. Schlaefli en Orient. Journal de Conchyliologie, 22 (1): 5-60. Paris
 Sands, A.F.; Glöer, P.; Gürlek, M.E.; Albrecht, C.; Neubauer, T.A. (2020). A revision of the extant species of Theodoxus (Gastropoda, Neritidae) in Asia, with the description of three new species. Zoosystematics and Evolution. 96(1): 25-66

Neritidae
Gastropods described in 1841